The Cleveland Indians finished in seventh place in the American League East. Sports Illustrated magazine predicted that the Indians would finish in first. Club president Peter Bavasi would resign before the regular season began. Bavasi had joined the Indians in November 1984. As president of the Cleveland Indians, he served on Major League Baseball's Executive Council. During the 1986 season, the team had an 84-78 record, its best since 1968, and attendance of 1.47 million, its highest since 1959. There was much optimism that the team would reach its full potential in 1987.

Sluggers Joe Carter and Cory Snyder were featured on the cover of Sports Illustrated on April 6, 1987, with the headline "Indian Uprising". The Indians were being predicted as the best team in baseball on the back of their two 30+ home run hitters. What sports writers overlooked was that Cleveland had the worst performing pitching staff in the majors, despite the presence of 300 game winners Phil Niekro and Steve Carlton, as well as Tom Candiotti (with Niekro and Candiotti, Cleveland had two starters whose main pitch was the knuckleball).

The 1987 Indians would fall well short of SI's bold prediction. They were not above .500 even once all season, and an 8–20 May ended any realistic hope of contention. They finished 61-101, the worst record in all of baseball. The season would go on to be associated with the Sports Illustrated cover jinx.

Offseason
 November 7, 1986: Fran Mullins was released by the Indians.
 November 28, 1986: Casey Parsons was signed as a free agent by the Indians.
 December 23, 1986: John Butcher was released by the Indians.
 January 19, 1987: Doug Frobel was signed as a free agent with the Cleveland Indians.
 February 23, 1987: Curt Wardle was traded by the Indians to the Oakland Athletics for Jeff Kaiser.

Regular season
In 1987, the Cleveland Indians achieved a baseball first. The Indians had veteran pitchers Steve Carlton and Phil Niekro on their roster to add experience. Their most notable accomplishment was appearing in a game together against the New York Yankees at Yankee Stadium. Carlton and Niekro became the first teammates and 300-game winners to appear in the same game. Both were ineffective in a 10-6 Yankee victory. It would be Carlton's first and only pitching appearance at the legendary stadium. Neither pitcher finished the season with the Indians. Carlton would end up with the Minnesota Twins and win a World Series championship. Niekro would be picked up by the Toronto Blue Jays and come within two games of winning the American League East Championship.

Season standings

Record vs. opponents

Transactions
 April 4, 1987: Steve Carlton signed as a free agent with the Indians.
 May 11, 1987: Don Schulze was traded by the Indians to the New York Mets for Ricky Nelson.
 May 12, 1987: Dave Gallagher was traded by the Indians to the Seattle Mariners for Mark Huismann.
 July 15, 1987: Tony Bernazard was traded by the Indians to the Oakland Athletics for Darrel Akerfelds and Brian Dorsett.
 July 31, 1987: Steve Carlton was traded by the Indians to the Minnesota Twins for a player to be named later. The Twins completed the deal by sending Jeff Perry (minors) to the Indians on August 18.

Draft picks
 June 2, 1987: 1987 Major League Baseball Draft
Albert Belle was drafted by the Indians in the 2nd round. Belle signed on August 27, 1987.
Beau Allred was drafted by the Indians in the 25th round.

Opening Day Lineup

Roster

Statistics

Batting
Note: G = Games played; AB = At bats; R = Runs scored; H = Hits; 2B = Doubles; 3B = Triples; HR = Home runs; RBI = Runs batted in; AVG = Batting average; SB = Stolen bases

Pitching
Note: W = Wins; L = Losses; ERA = Earned run average; G = Games pitched; GS = Games started; SV = Saves; IP = Innings pitched; R = Runs allowed; ER = Earned runs allowed; BB = Walks allowed; K = Strikeouts

Award winners

All-Star Game
 Pat Tabler, designated hitter, reserve

Farm system

LEAGUE CHAMPIONS: Burlington

References

1987 Cleveland Indians team page at Baseball Reference
1987 Cleveland Indians team page at www.baseball-almanac.com

Cleveland Guardians seasons
Cleveland Indians season
Cleve